Saramacca River is a river in Suriname. The Arawaks named this river "Surama", and today's name "Saramacca" is probably derived from it. It originates in the Wilhelmina Mountains and flows northwards and enters the Atlantic Ocean together with the Coppename River. It has a river basin of 9.400 km2 and length of 255 km. The Saramacca River is used for water transport. Scientific exploration of the river began in the 1770s.

References 
 

Rivers of Suriname